Thomas S. Negus may refer to:
 Thomas S. Negus (manufacturer) (1828–1894)
 Thomas S. Negus (pilot boat)